Gamalama is a near-conical stratovolcano that comprises the entire Ternate island in Indonesia. The island lies off the western shore of Halmahera island in the north of the Maluku Islands. For centuries, Ternate was a center of Portuguese and Dutch forts for spice trade, which have accounted for thorough reports of Gamalama's volcanic activities.

An eruption in 1775 caused the deaths of approximately 1300 people.

On December 4, 2011 Mount Gamalama erupted, ejecting material up to 2,000 meters into the air. Thousands of residents in nearby Ternate City fled due to ash and dust particles raining down on the town.  Finally on December 27 some 4 people died and dozens injured from debris falls (lahar) after a month of activity.

More eruptions occurred in September 2012.

An eruption on December 18, 2014, deposited five centimeters of ash on the runway of Babullah Airport in Ternate, closing the airport.

See also 

 List of volcanoes in Indonesia
 List of Ultras of Malay Archipelago

References

External links 
 "Gamalama, Indonesia" on Peakbagger

Stratovolcanoes of Indonesia
Active volcanoes of Indonesia
Mountains of Indonesia
Ternate
Landforms of North Maluku
Holocene stratovolcanoes